Hua Chunying (born 24 April 1970) is a Chinese official and former diplomat serving as a spokesperson for the Ministry of Foreign Affairs of the People's Republic of China since 2012 and as the Assistant Minister of Foreign Affairs since 2021. Hua was the fifth spokeswoman and 27th spokesperson since the position was established in the ministry in 1983.

Biography
Hua was born in Huai'an, Jiangsu. Both her parents were officials. Her father was formerly secretary of the Discipline Inspection Commission of the Chinese Communist Party in Huai'an County, and her mother was the deputy director of a local district. She graduated from Nanjing University in 1992, where she majored in English language at the School of Foreign Languages.

After graduation, Hua was appointed as an official to the Department of Western Europe. Over a period of 20 years, Hua worked her way up to the position of spokeswoman. From 1995, she spent four years in Singapore as an attaché. During 2003 to 2010, she was promoted from secretary to counselor in China's mission to the European Union.

In 2012, Hua was promoted to deputy director of the Foreign Ministry Information Department of the People's Republic of China. She served concurrently as the spokeswoman for the Ministry of Foreign Affairs of the People's Republic of China. In February 2018, during a prolonged absence at the Foreign Ministry, there were reports that Hua was investigated for storing large amounts of U.S. dollars in her home. On March 1, 2018, Hua returned to work as Foreign Ministry spokeswoman. On July 18, 2019, she was appointed director of the Foreign Ministry Information Department of the People's Republic of China, succeeding Lu Kang. She became the second female director-general of the Information Department after Gong Peng, the very first director-general of this department. In October 2021, she was promoted to assistant minister of foreign affairs. Hua will be overseeing the ministry’s work related to information, protocol, and translation.

Commentary
Hua has criticized the US plea to release Pu Zhiqiang, saying, "I think lots of people have the same feeling with me, that some people in the United States have hearts that are too big and hands that are too long. Washington should address human rights problems at home and stop trying to be the world's policeman or judge."

In 2021, she compared the January 6 United States Capitol attack with the 2019 storming of the Legislative Council Complex.

COVID-19 conspiracy theory

In January 2021, Hua renewed questions about the SARS-CoV-2 virus originating in the United States at the Fort Detrick Army Medical Command Installation. This conspiracy theory quickly went trending on the Chinese social media platform Weibo, and Hua continued to cite evidence on Twitter, while asking the government of the United States to open up Fort Detrick for further investigation to determine if it is the source of the SARS-CoV-2 virus.

Social media 
In February 2021, Hua said that many Western officials use Weibo and Wechat, and asked, "Why can't Chinese people use Twitter or Facebook when foreigners can use Chinese social media platforms?" Twitter and Facebook have been banned by the mainland Chinese government since 2009.

2022 Russian invasion of Ukraine
On 24 February, at a Chinese Foreign Ministry press conference, Hua said that, "China is still the only permanent member of the United Nations Security Council that has not yet achieved the complete reunification of the motherland." The situation with the 2022 Russian invasion of Ukraine would be instructive to learn “how to fight the armed reunification”. Just as she foresaw resolution of the European conflict within 48 hours, if the “war of reunification of Taiwan” starts, the “highest goal” of the People's Liberation Army (PLA) would be to “reunify Taiwan”. The PLA would not delay and thus not give adversaries the time and opportunity to intervene militarily and politically. In Hua's vision, the PLA would also "defeat the island’s naval and air forces in the shortest possible time, seize air and sea control, provide security for subsequent landing operations, eliminate Taiwan’s combat power within 48 hours, and take full control of Taiwan within 72 hours."

Taiwan 

In August 2022, Hua warned that Nancy Pelosi should not visit Taiwan, threatening that, "We closely follow Pelosi's itinerary. If the U.S. insists on going its own way, China will take firm and powerful measures to safeguard China’s sovereignty and security interests." Later that month, after Pelosi's visit, Hua made a tweet asserting that Taiwan was a part of China because "Baidu Maps  that there are 38 Shandong dumpling restaurants and 67 Shanxi noodle restaurants in Taipei." The tweet was ridiculed by other Twitter users, who replied with examples of restaurant listings across the world.

Personal life
Hua Chunying enjoys playing tennis.

See also  

 Xi Jinping Thought on Diplomacy
 Misinformation related to the COVID-19 pandemic by China

References

1970 births
Living people
21st-century Chinese politicians
21st-century Chinese women politicians
Chinese Communist Party politicians from Jiangsu
Delegates to the 20th National Congress of the Chinese Communist Party
Nanjing University alumni
People's Republic of China politicians from Jiangsu
Politicians from Huai'an
Spokespersons for the Ministry of Foreign Affairs of the People's Republic of China
Women government ministers of China